Brumer may refer to:

People
 Alon Brumer (born 1973), a former Israeli professional footballer (twin brother of Gadi Brumer)
 Gadi Brumer (born 1973), a former Israeli professional footballer (twin brother of Alon Brumer)

Other
 Brumer bound, a bound for the rank of an elliptic curve, proved by Armand Brumer
 Brumer–Stark conjecture, a conjecture in algebraic number theory, named after Armand Brumer and Harold Stark
 Brumer Islands, an island group of Papua New Guinea

See also
Brummer (disambiguation)